Jouvenet's shrew (Crocidura jouvenetae) is a species of mammal in the family Soricidae. It is found in Côte d'Ivoire, Guinea, Liberia, and Sierra Leone. This species is present in lowland tropical moist forest and possibly in montane forest.

It was first described by Henri Heim de Balsac who named it after Mademmoiselle A. Jouvenet.

References

Jouvenet's shrew
Mammals of West Africa
Jouvenet's shrew
Taxa named by Henri Heim de Balsac